The Richmond Tigers were a minor league baseball team based in Richmond, Indiana. From 1949 to 1951, the "Tigers" played as members of the Class D level Ohio–Indiana League as an affiliate of the Detroit Tigers. Richmond began play in the Ohio–Indiana League as the Richmond "Roses," who played in the Class D level Ohio State League in 1946 and 1947, before the league changed names in 1948. The Roses were an affiliate of the Boston Braves. The Richmond teams hosted minor league home games at Municipal Ball Park.

Baseball Hall of Fame member Jim Bunning played for the 1950 Richmond Tigers in his first professional season.

History
The 1946 Richmond Roses were preceded by the 1930 Richmond Roses of the Class B level Central League.

The Richmond Roses resumed minor league baseball play in 1946 as members of the eight–team Class D level Ohio State League, which was expanding from a six–team league in 1945, adding teams in Richmond and Dayton. The Dayton Indians, Lima Terriers, Marion Cardinals, Middletown Rockets, Newark Moundsmen, Springfield Giants and Zanesville Dodgers joined Richmond in beginning league play on April 30, 1946.

The Richmond Roses were an affiliate of the Boston Braves. Richmond ended the 1946 Ohio State League season with a record of 76–63, placing 3rd in the Ohio State League, finishing 6.0 games behind the 1st place Springfield Giants.Merle Settlemire served as manager, as the Roses qualified for the playoffs. The Zanesville Dodgers defeated Richmond in a four–game sweep in the 1st round of playoffs.

Continuing play in the 1947 Ohio State League, the Roses placed 5th and did not qualify for the playoffs. Richmond ended the 1947 regular season with a record of 62–72, finishing 24.5 games behind the 1st place Zanesville Dodgers. The Roses were managed by Rex Carr. Richmond's Robert Verrier led the league with 127 runs scored.

In 1948, the Ohio State League expanded beyond the state and became the Class D level Ohio–Indiana League. The Muncie Packers joined seven returning Ohio State League teams in beginning league play on May 2, 1948.

The Roses continued as a minor league affiliate of the Boston Braves in 1948. Ending the 1948 Ohio–Indiana League season in 6th place, Richmond did not qualify for the playoffs of the eight–team league. The Roses had a record of 64–75, playing under manager Ollie Byers and finished 18.0 games behind the 1st place Zanesville Dodgers in the regular season final standings.

In 1949, Richmond became a minor league affiliate of the Detroit Tigers. The newly named Richmond "Tigers" placed 7th in the regular season standings. The Tigers ended the regular season with a record of 65–73, playing the season under managers Cyril Pfeifer and Kenneth Holtcamp. The Tigers finished 15.5 games behind the 1st place Portsmouth A's.

The Richmond Tigers qualified for the 1950 Ohio-Indiana League playoffs. Managed by the returning Kenneth Holtcamp, the Tigers ended the 1950 regular season with a record of 80–58, placing 3rd in the standings, while finishing 10.0 games behind the pennant winning Marion Red Sox. In the playoffs, the Newark Yankees defeated Richmond  3 games to 2 in the 1st round. Keith Jones of Richmond led the league in runs scored, with 140.

Baseball Hall of Fame member Jim Bunning played for the 1950 Richmond Tigers. At age 18, if his first professional season, Bunning compiled a 7–8 record with a 3.22 ERA in 17 games and 123 innings pitched for Richmond. Bunning graduated from high school in 1949 and was attending Xavier University, playing on a baseball scholarship. Bunning was signed by the Detroit Tigers in May, 1950 and joined the Richmond Tigers after finishing his spring semester at Xavier. Bunning received a $4,000 signing bonus and a $150.00 per month salary. Bunning was inducted into the Baseball Hall of Fame in 1996 and his number 14 is retired by the Philadelphia Phillies.

In its final season of play, the 1951 Ohio–Indiana League compacted to become a five–team league. The Newark Yankees won the first–half title in a split–season schedule, with the first–half season schedule ending on June 18, 1951. Newark then folded on July 17, 1951, with the four remaining teams, Richmond included, completing the second–half of the season. At the conclusion of the season, the Tigers finished 37.5 games behind the Marion Red Sox in the overall standings with a 53–74 record, playing the season under manager Ralph DiLullo. The Ohio–Indiana League permanently folded following the completion of the 1951 season.

Following the Tigers, Richmond was without minor league baseball until the 1995 Richmond Roosters began play in the independent Frontier League.

The ballpark
The Richmond Roses and Tigers teams played minor league home games at Municipal Ball Park. Constructed in 1936, the ballpark was later renamed  to become Don McBride Stadium. The Don McBride Stadium is still in use today, located at 204 NW 13st Street.

Timeline

Year–by–year records

Notable alumni

Baseball Hall of Famealumni
Jim Bunning (1950) Inducted, 1996

Notable alumni
George Bullard (1951)
Ralph DiLullo (1951, MGR)
Billy Hoeft (1950)
Les Pinkham (1951)
Hank Raymonds (1948)
Merle Settlemire (1946, MGR)
Ron Shoop (1951)

See also
Richmond Roses playersRichmond Tigers players

References

External links
Baseball Reference
Don McBride Stadium
Don McBride Stadium photos

Defunct minor league baseball teams
Professional baseball teams in Indiana
Defunct baseball teams in Indiana
Baseball teams established in 1949
Baseball teams disestablished in 1951
Detroit Tigers minor league affiliates
Richmond, Indiana
Sports in Richmond, Indiana
Ohio-Indiana League teams